Rajeshwar Dayal (1909–1999) was an Indian diplomat, writer, Ambassador of India to the former state of Yugoslavia and the Head of the United Nations Operation in the Congo. Born on 12 August 1909, Dayal was one of the earlier officers of the Indian Foreign Service. He served as the Indian ambassador to the now defunct Yugoslavia from 1955 to 1958 and moved to the UN as a member of the United Nations Observation Group in Lebanon (UNOGIL) when the organization was established in 1958.

Dayal, who had earlier served as the Indian Ambassador to France, was appointed as the Head of the United Nations Operation in the Congo in September 1960 and he held the post till May 1961. He also worked as the Representative of the Secretary General of the United Nations. He published several books on socio-political themes, including a book on Panchayati Raj under the title, Panchayati Raj in India. The Government of India awarded him the second highest civilian award of the Padma Vibhushan, (then the highest civilian award)  in 1969.

He died on 17 September 1999 in New Delhi, following a stroke. His life has been documented in his autobiography, A Life of Our Times, published in 1998, one year prior to his death.

See also

 United Nations Operation in the Congo

References

Further reading

External links
 , Retrieved 6 October 2015

|-

|-

Recipients of the Padma Vibhushan in civil service
1909 births
1999 deaths
Indian Foreign Service officers
Indian political writers
Indian officials of the United Nations
Ambassadors of India to Yugoslavia
Ambassadors of India to France
People from Nainital
Writers from Uttarakhand
People of the Congo Crisis